Ilargus is a genus of the spider family Salticidae (jumping spiders).

Species
As of June 2017, the World Spider Catalog lists the following species in the genus:
 Ilargus coccineus Simon, 1901 – Brazil
 Ilargus florezi Galvis, 2015 –  Colombia
 Ilargus foliosus Zhang & Maddison, 2012 – Ecuador
 Ilargus galianoae Zhang & Maddison, 2012 – Ecuador
 Ilargus macrocornis Zhang & Maddison, 2012 – Ecuador
 Ilargus moronatigus Zhang & Maddison, 2012 – Ecuador
 Ilargus nitidisquamulatus Soares & Camargo, 1948 – Brazil
 Ilargus pilleolus Zhang & Maddison, 2012 – Ecuador
 Ilargus serratus Zhang & Maddison, 2012 – Ecuador
 Ilargus singularis Caporiacco, 1955 – Venezuela

References

Salticidae
Spiders of South America
Salticidae genera